Weishample is a community in Barry Township, Schuylkill County in the U.S. state of Pennsylvania, about 20 miles northeast of Harrisburg.

The town is supposedly named after Rev. John Frederick Weishampel due to his association with John Winebrenner.

Unincorporated communities in Schuylkill County, Pennsylvania
Unincorporated communities in Pennsylvania